Ariusia is a genus of praying mantises in the family Eremiaphilidae. It contains only one species, Ariusia conspersa.

See also
List of mantis genera and species

References

 
Tarachodidae
Mantodea genera

pt:Apteromantis